Group 1 Crew is the first full-length studio album from Group 1 Crew. It was released on February 20, 2007 under Fervent Records, Curb Records, and Word Records. Can't Go On is featured on WOW Hits 2007.

Track listing

Special Edition DVD
A Special edition DVD was packaged with the CD for the first few weeks after its debut.  The DVD is still available at Family Christian, LifeWay, and other Christian retailers, as well as Amazon.com and eBay.

The DVD includes:
"Love Is a Beautiful Thing" music video
"Forgive Me" music video
Behind-the-scenes footage

Both music videos are available on iTunes. "Forgive Me" is an album-only feature, however.

Singles
 "Forgive Me"
 "(Everybody's Gotta) Song to Sing"
 "Love Is a Beautiful Thing"
 "Can't Go On"

Awards

In 2008, the album won a Dove Award for Rap/Hip-Hop Album of the Year at the 39th GMA Dove Awards.

References 

Group 1 Crew albums
2007 albums